Frédéric Maurice Casimir de La Tour d'Auvergne (Frédéric Maurice Casimir; 24 October 1702 – 1 October 1723) styled Prince of Turenne, was the eldest surviving son of Emmanuel Théodose de La Tour d'Auvergne (1668–1730). He died aged 20. He was the short-lived son-in-law of James Louis Sobieski.

Biography

Frédéric Maurice Casimir was born to Emmanuel Théodose de La Tour d'Auvergne (1668–1730) and his first wife Marie Armande Victoire de La Trémouille. His father was the ruler of the Duchy of Bouillon, a small principality in present-day Belgium. The second of their sons, he was not styled prince de Turenne till his older brother's death (Godefroy Maurice) in 1705 aged just 3.

From 1705, he was his father's heir apparent. Engaged to Maria Karolina Sobieska, daughter of James Louis Sobieski, sister of Clementina Sobieski and grand daughter of John III Sobieski, the young prince had a proxy marriage on 25 August 1723 at Neuss, Silesia.

Having been married in person in Strassburg on 20 September, he died whilst travelling back. Buried in Münster, his wife of only two months later married his younger brother Charles Godefroy, who, as a result of Frédéric Maurice Casimir's death became Prince of Turenne.

Ancestry

References and notes

1702 births
1723 deaths
18th-century French people
Frederic Maurice Casimir
French nobility
Heirs apparent who never acceded
Grand Chamberlains of France
People of Byzantine descent